Mario Romero (born 15 August 1938) is a Venezuelan boxer. He competed in the men's lightweight event at the 1960 Summer Olympics. At the 1960 Summer Olympics, he lost to Harry Campbell of the United States.

References

1938 births
Living people
Venezuelan male boxers
Olympic boxers of Venezuela
Boxers at the 1960 Summer Olympics
Sportspeople from Maracay
Pan American Games medalists in boxing
Pan American Games bronze medalists for Venezuela
Boxers at the 1959 Pan American Games
Lightweight boxers
Medalists at the 1959 Pan American Games